William de Jesús Naranjo Jaramillo (born August 18, 1978 in Riosucio, Caldas) is a male long-distance runner from Colombia, who twice represented his native country at the Pan American Games (2003 and 2007). He set his personal best in the men's 5,000 metres (13:22.30) on July 3, 2004 in San Sebastián.

He is a two-time South American Cross Country Champion, having won in both 2005 and 2007.

Achievements

References

Profile

1978 births
Living people
Colombian male long-distance runners
Athletes (track and field) at the 2003 Pan American Games
Athletes (track and field) at the 2007 Pan American Games
People from Caldas Department
Pan American Games competitors for Colombia
Central American and Caribbean Games bronze medalists for Colombia
Competitors at the 2002 Central American and Caribbean Games
Central American and Caribbean Games medalists in athletics